Gibusong, variously Hibusong and Hibuson, is a Waray-speaking island in Mindanao, Philippines, in the province of Dinagat Islands. It lies northwest of Dinagat Island, at the north end of Surigao Strait connecting with Leyte Gulf and is under the jurisdiction of the municipality of Loreto. The island, together with the smaller Little Gibusong Island, is administratively divided into three barangays: Liberty, Helene, and Magsaysay. A ferry route connects Liberty with the main port of Loreto.

History
Gibusong Island was part of the stops in Magellan's circumnavigation expedition. As a gateway passage to the Visayas, the island served as the route leading to the rest of the Visayas encounter of Magellan's expedition after their very first Visayan encounter with the Samarnons in Suluan and Homonhon, now both parts of Guiuan, Eastern Samar.

Climate
Like most of the country, Gibusong is officially considered a tropical rainforest climate type, Köppen class Af with an average monthly precipitation of 308.66 mm (12.5 inches). However, it is distinctly wettest between the months of November until March. During the drier season between April to September, brief afternoon showers and thunderstorms locally called sobasco, are commonplace.

References

External links
 Gibusong Island at OpenStreetMap

Islands of Dinagat Islands